Peter David Stemkowski (born August 25, 1943) is a former centre and forward in the National Hockey League. Over fifteen seasons, he played for the Toronto Maple Leafs, Detroit Red Wings, New York Rangers, and Los Angeles Kings. Stemkowski is best remembered for his heroics in the 1970–71 Stanley Cup semifinals when he scored two overtime goals for the New York Rangers in an eventual series loss to the Chicago Black Hawks. He won the Stanley Cup in 1967 with the Toronto Maple Leafs. Considered a textbook "two-way" centre, able to kill penalties and play defence as well as scoring goals, Stemkowski is also remembered as one of the top faceoff takers of the NHL.

Playing career
Pete Stemkowski had a solid NHL career that lasted 14 years. A useful and aggressive forward, "Stemmer" always took a back seat of attention wherever he played.

Pete was a product of the Toronto Maple Leafs junior system. He played in his native Winnipeg before moving to Toronto at the age of 17 to play with the Ontario Hockey Association's Toronto Marlboros, the Leafs' junior team.

After splitting his first three professional seasons between the Leafs and their American Hockey League farm team in Rochester NY, Stemkowski finally made the Leafs squad in 1966–67. It was great timing as the Leafs won the Stanley Cup that year. Stemkowski, 24 at the time, was an important contributor with 12 points in 12 games. But the focus fell upon aging veterans like Terry Sawchuk, Johnny Bower, George Armstrong, Allan Stanley, Frank Mahovlich and Tim Horton.

He was part of an six-player blockbuster transaction in which he was traded along with Frank Mahovlich and Garry Unger from the Maple Leafs to the Red Wings for Norm Ullman, Paul Henderson and Floyd Smith on March 4, 1968. The Maple Leafs and Red Wings were in fifth and sixth place respectively at the bottom of the East Division standings at the time of the deal. It was a good trade for Stemkowski though. It gave him a chance to play regularly and he responded well with two 20+ goal seasons in his two full seasons in Detroit.

Stemkowski was traded to the Rangers for Larry Brown on October 31, 1970. This was partially a result of an incident in practice where Stemkowski disrespected new head coach Ned Harkness. Harkness had just come to Detroit from Cornell University. Stemkowski, a noted joker, was mockingly imitating a college cheer. Harkness made sure Stemkowski was gone shortly afterwards.

The Rangers, after suffering through many lean years, were emerging as a powerhouse. A good mix of veterans like Rod Gilbert, Jean Ratelle and Ed Giacomin with enthusiastic help from young players such as Stemkowski, Brad Park, Steve Vickers and Walt Tkaczuk. Stemkowski especially was very popular with the Madison Square Gardens faithful.

Despite the Rangers losing a 1971 Stanley Cup semifinal series in seven games to the Chicago Black Hawks, Stemkowski scored game-winning overtime goals in each of two matches. The first occurred just 1:37 into overtime to decide a 2–1 Game 1 win at Chicago Stadium on April 18. With the Rangers facing elimination in Game 6, he scored the most famous goal of his playing career eleven nights later at 1:29 of the third overtime, after a total of 41:29 of extra time, in a 3–2 victory at Madison Square Garden that forced a deciding seventh game. The contest lasted 4 hours 23 minutes and ended two minutes before midnight ET.

Stemkowski played six strong seasons in New York, during which he recorded three 20+ goal seasons.

In 1977–78, Stemkowski finished his career playing one season with the Los Angeles Kings. Speaking of the experience, he said, "I started my career in Toronto in the early 60's. The Leafs were a real powerhouse back then and all you heard was hockey 24 hours a day. When I came to the Kings the whole atmosphere changed. I'd go to the bank and the teller asked me what I did. I said I play for the Kings. The teller said, "who and what are the Kings?"

With Los Angeles, Stemkowski played with Dave Schultz and Marcel Dionne. "I remember a lot of traveling with the Kings and that I played with Dave "The Hammer" Schultz. I got to know the other side of the reigning "bad boy" in the NHL. He helped me find a place to live when I first arrived."

"Playing with Marcel Dionne was a treat. He was such a talent. Marcel and his family really did a lot to keep the team close. Every Sunday Marcel would invite the entire team over to his house for a barbecue and swim."

Broadcasting career
As of May 1982, Stemkowski was a morning disc jockey for WDJZ in Bridgeport, Connecticut. He was also a freelance announcer for the Entertainment Sports Network.

He has served a stint as the television (1992–1996) and radio colour commentator (2000–2005) for the San Jose Sharks and now does so for the New York Rangers on a part-time basis. He was rumoured to be a candidate to become the Rangers' full-time radio analyst in 2006–07 but has retained his back-up role and makes appearances at Rangers events.

Hockey awards and achievements
Memorial Cup Championship (1964)
Stanley Cup Championship (1967)
Played in NHL All-Star Game (1968)
"Honoured Member" of the Manitoba Hockey Hall of Fame.
 In the 2009 book 100 Ranger Greats, was ranked No. 54 all-time of the 901 New York Rangers who had played during the team's first 82 seasons
National Polish American Sports Hall of Fame – 2002

Career statistics

Conviction for criminal solicitation
  	
On May 7, 1982, Stemkowski pleaded guilty to a single misdemeanor count of criminal solicitation in Nassau County, New York.  Stemkowski had lent $35,000 to a business associate, which had not been repaid along with $35,000 in interest.  He offered $20,000 to an undercover Nassau County police officer to fly to California and break an ankle and wrist of the business associate.  After making his guilty plea, Stemkowski expressed remorse for his actions, saying, "Something was rightfully owed to me.  I felt I had to get it back.  Foolishly and stupidly, I went about it the wrong way."  By pleading guilty, Stemkowski avoided a charge of conspiracy.

References

External links

1943 births
Living people
Canadian people of Polish descent
Detroit Red Wings players
Los Angeles Kings players
National Hockey League broadcasters
New York Rangers players
San Jose Sharks announcers
Ice hockey people from Winnipeg
Stanley Cup champions
Toronto Maple Leafs players
Toronto Marlboros players
Winnipeg Monarchs players
Canadian ice hockey centres